Ceylonthelphusa kandambyi is a species of decapod in the family Gecarcinucidae.

The IUCN conservation status of Ceylonthelphusa kandambyi is "NT", near threatened. The species may be considered threatened in the near future. The population is stable. The IUCN status was reviewed in 2008.

References

Further reading

 

Ceylonthelphusa
Articles created by Qbugbot
Crustaceans described in 1999